Karim Qazhymqanuly Massimov (born 15 June 1965) is a politician who served as a Prime Minister of Kazakhstan from 10 January 2007 to 24 September 2012 and again from 2 April 2014 to 8 September 2016.

Massimov served as Deputy Prime Minister from 19 January 2006 to 9 January 2007 and as Minister of Economy and Budget Planning, Minister of Transport and Communications in 2001. President Nursultan Nazarbayev nominated Massimov to succeed Daniyal Akhmetov as Prime Minister on 9 January 2007. The Nur Otan party endorsed Massimov's candidacy and Parliament confirmed the nomination on 10 January.

On 24 September 2012, Massimov's Premiership ended when President Nazarbayev dismissed him as from the position, appointing him chief of staff of the presidential office in order to readjust the power balance between various factions within the government. He was the head of Kazakhstan's National Security Committee until he was dismissed by President Kassym-Jomart Tokayev on 5 January 2022 and shortly after detained on suspicion of alleged treason. Since 6 January, Massimov has been a political prisoner, awaiting the result of a trial which has been classified as 'top secret', lacking any form of independent or public scrutiny.

Early life and career
Karim Massimov was born to a Muslim family of Tajik and Uyghur roots, in the city of Tselinograd (now Astana, Kazakhstan).  He is the son of Eleanor Azhybekova and Qazhymqan Massimov. His father held various managerial positions such as being the director of the Burundai Production Association of Wall Materials, deputy chief of the Glavtopsnab under the Council of Ministers of the Kazakh SSR, director of the Massimov Health Center LLP. In addition, he was president organizations of the National Agro-Industrial Chamber of Kazakhstan and the Kazakhstan Yoga Association.

Education 
In 1982, Massimov graduated from the Republican Physics and Mathematics Boarding School in Alma-Ata. From 1985 to 1988, he studied at the People's Friendship University of Russia where he learned Arabic, then the Alma-Ata Institute of National Economy.

From 1988 to 1989, Massimov studied Chinese at the Beijing Institute of Language, taught at the Wuhan University School of Law from 1989 to 1991, and then Columbia University in New York City. In 1998, he graduated from the graduate school of the Kazakh State Academy of Management. In 1999, Massimov earned a doctoral degree from the Moscow State University of Technologies and Management named after K.G. Razumovskiy. That same year, he defended his doctoral dissertation on the topic "Problems of the formation of industry of the Republic of Kazakhstan and ways to solve them (theory and practice)".

Business career 
From 1992 to 1995, Massimov worked at Kazakhstan's commercial structures in China and Hong Kong. From 1995 to 1997 he was the chairman of the Board of the Almaty Trade and Financial Bank. While serving that post, Massimov became an acting chairman of the Board of Turanbank in 1996. From 1997 to 2000, he served as the chairman of the Board of the People's Savings Bank of Kazakhstan.

Political career 
In 1991, Massimov became the head of the Department of the Ministry of Labour.

On 7 August 2000, he was appointed as the Minister of Transport and Communications. On 27 November 2001, he became the Deputy Prime Minister of Kazakhstan. Massimov served the post until June 2003, he was appointed as an assistant to the President of Kazakhstan.

Massimov again became the Deputy PM on 18 January 2006, and was simultaneously as the Minister of Economy from 19 April to 13 October 2006.

Foreign policy

China
Massimov is considered a China expert. China has become an important strategic partner for Kazakhstan in recent years and the two countries are working closely together to develop Kazakhstan's energy resources. Massimov visited Beijing, China with Finance Minister Natalya Korzhova, Transport and Communications Minister Serik Akhmetov, and Energy and Mineral Resources Minister Baktykozha Izmukhambetov from 16 to 17 November 2006. Massimov co-chaired the third meeting of the China-Kazakhstan Cooperation Committee with Chinese Vice Premier Wu Yi. Several accords between agencies of the two governments were signed. Massimov later met with Chinese Prime Minister Wen Jiabao. Meanwhile, Kazakh President Nursultan Nazarbayev met with Liu Qi, secretary of the Beijing Party Committee, in Astana. Secretary Liu said was "very nice for me to visit your beautiful country at Otan's invitation. The goal of the visit is to deepen cooperation and mutual understanding between our countries."

Iran
On 28 March 2002, in an article in Izvestia, Massimov announced that the Government of Kazakhstan planned to increase wheat exports to Iran from 100,000 to two million tons.

Israel
Massimov and Israeli Vice Premier Shimon Peres announced from Jerusalem on 29 October 2006 that the state-owned National Innovation Fund of Kazakhstan would begin investing in the Peace Valley project and other projects in the Middle East. Massimov said, "I came to Israel with a clear message to the nation in Zion from the president, that Kazakhstan is a moderate Muslim state which is interested in being involved in the Middle East. Kazakhstan intends to found political and economic ties with Israel and its neighbors." Massimov mentioned the Dead Sea canal and expressed desire to create a free trade zone. Vice Premier Peres and Massimov agreed to establish an agriculture school in each country. The NIF has given US$10 million to Israeli VC fund Vertex.

Massimov also met with Israeli Prime Minister Ehud Olmert, who praised Kazakhstan for showing a "beautiful face of Islam. Contemporary, ever-developing Kazakhstan is a perfect example of both economic development and interethnic accord that should be followed by more Muslim states."

Prime Minister of Kazakhstan (2007–2012, 2014–2016)

Nomination for Prime Minister

President Nazarbayev nominated Massimov to succeed Daniyal Akhmetov as Prime Minister on 9 January 2007. Akhmetov resigned on 8 January without explanation. Analysts attributed Akhmetov's political downfall to the President's criticism of his administrative oversight of the economy. The Parliament voted overwhelmingly in favor of the nomination on 10 January with 37 out of 39 Senators and 66 of 77 Assemblymen from the Mazhilis voting for Massimov. Akhmetov became the Defense Minister, replacing Mukhtar Altynbayev.

First term (2007–2012) 

In an interview to Echo of Moscow radio on 12 December 2008, Massimov said about himself: "I myself am an Internet user, I myself am a blogger." A couple of months later, he opened his blog on the government's website, explaining the need to provide high-quality, interesting and useful information about the socio-economic situation in the country. From that moment on, members of the government actively went online. Ministers' accounts appeared in many social networks, and virtual blogs have replaced real receptions.

Massimov's government faced the worldwide Great Recession. On 4 February 2009, the National Bank of Kazakhstan devalued the Kazakhstani tenge by 22%. Massimov ordered to stabilize prices in Kazakhstan by instructing law enforcement agencies to ensure that the dollar exchange rate fluctuates within 150 tenge plus or minus 3%. The reforms and strategic interventions pursued by the government almost doubled the GDP per capita of Kazakhstan from 2008-2012, with economic growth rates reaching an average level of 5.5% per year. 

The first phase of the Kazakh Unified National Healthcare System was implemented during this time. 

Massimov was directly involved in the preparation for the 2011 Asian Winter Games, by ordering to make the facilities accessible to ordinary citizens "so that they could improve their sports skills."

On 24 September 2012, Massimov announced his resignation from the post of the PM, which was accepted by President Nursultan Nazarbayev in which he explained "his work fell on the time of the strongest global financial and economic crisis, and our country came out with honor, this is a large part of the merit of the government and the prime minister. When a person is already tired and wants to change his position, and he explains this by the fact that a new man, I heeded this and released him."

Second term (2014–2016) 

On 2 April 2014, Massimov was reappointed again as the PM after replacing Serik Akhmetov. The possible reason was due to the economic troubles under Akhmetov in the country which faced lower GDP growth and devaluation of the tenge by 20% in February 2014 with Massimov having a better experience in running the government for such issues. Massimov was also known for his ability to raise foreign investment. 

After the annexation of Crimea by the Russia in March 2014 which resulted in international sanctions against Kazakhstan's main trading partner, Russia, exports between two countries shrank by 24.6%. In October 2014, the world faced an oil glut which the prices of oil per barrel fell to 4-year low of 82.93$. On 20 August 2015, the tenge lost 20% of its value due to the country's transition to a freely floating exchange rate of the currency. In response to the crisis, Massimov believed that without the intervention from the government, the economy would experience a default with its growth being restored along with an increase in credit and investment activity, creation of new jobs as well as the reduction of inflation. By the end of 2015, the tenge was seen as the most depreciated currency in Europe and the CIS countries with the currency being depreciated by 85.2%.

In the upcoming Expo 2017 event, Massimov visited facilities under construction and controlled the preparation process. During his tenure, a corruption scandal broke out in June 2015 over the company which the officials were accused of embezzling 10 billion ₸. Court hearings lasted several months which resulted in the ex-head of the national company Talgat Ermegiyaev was sentenced to 14 years in June 2016 after being found guilty of embezzling 5.9 billion ₸.

Massimov served as the chairman of the Bid Organizing Committee of Kazakhstan, which presented Almaty as a city for the 2022 Winter Olympics. In his address to the International Olympic Committee, he assured the IOC by saying:“We are a great opportunity to prove that developing countries can successfully host the Winter Games. We are a great opportunity to give Olympic and Paralympic athletes the true Winter Games experience they deserve and will life. We are a brilliant opportunity to demonstrate the true long-term strength of the Olympic legacy in a region that has never hosted the Games." Despite Massimov's statements, Beijing instead in July 2015 was chosen to hold the Olympics, receiving 44 votes against 40 for Kazakhstan.

In September 2015, the Massimov's government allowed the prices for the most popular grade of fuel in Kazakhstan, the AI-92, to float freely. From 108 ₸ per liter the price at some gas stations jumped almost to 150 ₸. The price eventually leveled off at around 128 ₸ per liter of fuel. In August 2016, the Government again deregulated of the fuel and lubricants market and struck diesel fuel from the list of products which maximum prices are set. As a result, the price of diesel fuel almost equaled to AI-92 by rising from 99 ₸ to 110-115 ₸.

Massimov was heavily involved in the “100  Concrete Steps” plan as head of the National Modernisation Commission. 

The change to a 12 year cycle education system was also brought in during Massimov’s tenure as Prime Minister.

He served that post until he was succeeded by Bakhytzhan Sagintayev.

Post-premiership 

After being relieved from his post as the PM, Massimov, while serving as the Head of the Presidential Administration, was also the Acting State Secretary of Kazakhstan from 21 January 2014 to 2 April 2014.

On 8 September 2016, Massimov became the chairman of the National Security Committee (NSC).

2022 dismissal and arrest

Massimov was dismissed as NSC chief on 5 January 2022 during the 2022 Kazakh protests, and arrested either on 6 January, per the official account, or by 8 January, when his arrest was announced publicly. It has been speculated that Massimov's arrest was because as head of the NSC he posed a threat to Tokayev’s authority, as sections of this agency would defer to Massimov rather than obeying instructions issued by Tokayev, including the "shoot to kill" order given to security forces on 7 January. Shortly after on 10 January, three security officials, Zhanat Suleimenov, Azamat Ibrayev and Tanat Nazanov, were found dead from an alleged suicide, fall from a tall building and heart attack. Joanna Lillis, writing in Eurasianet, speculated that Massimov was suspected of being involved in an attempted coup d'état that Nazarbayev former adviser Yermukhamet Yertysbayev claimed had occurred during the protests. No details were provided upon Massimov’s arrest on what actions could have represented an attempted overthrow of the government. 

On 13 January 2022, a pre-trial investigation was started against Massimov on the possible charge of high treason. The trial was classified as “top secret” on 27 January. 

On October 25 2022, the UN Working Group on Arbitrary Detention called on the government of Kazakhstan "to take urgent action to ensure the immediate unconditional release of Mr.Massimov" and to conduct an independent investigation into his arbitrary detention.

Personal life
Karim Massimov is ethnically Uyghur and is a born citizen of Kazakhstan. He is fluent in Kazakh, Russian, Chinese, English and Arabic. At the same time, he is thought to be well connected within the Kremlin.

Massimov is married and has three children. His interests include reading books, Muay Thai, skiing, rock climbing and golf.

Martial arts
Massimov was the President of Federation of Amateur Muaythai of Asia (FAMA) in 2010. The FAMA and the Continental Federation of International Federation of Muaythai Amateurs (IFMA) in Asia is the first Continental Federation since 1991, supporting the work and efforts of the IFMA. He then was nominated and went on to assume the position of Vice President of the IFMA, President of Muaythai federation in Kazakhstan and Vice-President of World Muaythai Council (WMC).

In 2012, Massimov was unanimously re-elected for another four-year term to head the Asian federation, which is recognised by the Olympic Council of Asia. He showed his support for the sport in an interview in which he stated that the sport "brings together athletes from across the world to train and compete with honour and in the spirit of cultural exchange and understanding."

See also
Government of Kazakhstan

References

External links
Cabinet of ministers of Kazakhstan 

Official Site of Prime Minister of Kazakhstan
PM Karim K. Massimov
Kazakh President accepts Prime Minister's resignation (Update3)
Analysis: Why the world cares about Kazakhstan

|-

1965 births
Living people
Kazakhstani people of Uyghur descent
Ministers of Economy (Kazakhstan)
Ministers of Transport and Communications (Kazakhstan)
Nur Otan politicians
People from Astana
Prime Ministers of Kazakhstan
Uyghur people
Wuhan University alumni
Directors of intelligence agencies
Government ministers of Kazakhstan
Deputy Prime Ministers of Kazakhstan